The women's alpine skiing downhill event was part of the alpine skiing at the 1948 Winter Olympics programme. It was the first appearance of the event. The competition was held on Monday, February 2; thirty-seven alpine skiers from eleven nations competed.

Medalists

Results
This race was also part of the alpine combined event.

References

External links
Official Olympic Report
 

Women's alpine skiing at the 1948 Winter Olympics
Olymp
Alp